Fourth-wave feminism is a feminist movement that began around 2012 and is characterized by a focus on the empowerment of women, the use of internet tools, and intersectionality. The fourth wave seeks greater gender equality by focusing on gendered norms and the marginalization of women in society.

Fourth-wave feminism became a movement for women to share their stories online about sexual abuse, sexual harassment, sexual violence, the objectification of women, and sexism in the workplace. The internet gave women the opportunity for their voices to be heard around the world in a matter of seconds. Social media gave women the possibility to talk freely about topics on their own time and on their terms. As women all over the world began telling stories, they realized the magnitude of the problem and how it was happening everywhere. Internet activism is a key feature of the fourth wave.

The fourth wave emphasizes intersectionality and interlocking systems of power, and how these contribute to the social stratification of traditionally marginalized groups, such as people of color and trans people. Fourth-wave feminists advocate (like earlier feminists) for greater representation of these groups in politics and business, and argue that society would be more equitable if policies and practices incorporated the perspectives of all people.

Fourth-wave feminism argues for equal pay for equal work and that the equal opportunities sought for girls and women should extend also to boys and men in order to overcome gender norms (for example, by expressing emotions and feelings freely, expressing themselves physically as they wish, and being engaged parents to their children). The utilization of print, news, and social media platforms to collaborate, mobilize, and speak out against sexual assault, sexual objectification, sexual harassment, and other forms of gender-based violence is prominent.

History and definition

Some feminists argue that in the 1980s, conservative figures like Margaret Thatcher and Ronald Reagan challenged gains feminists had made up to that point. At the same time, feminists in North America, Latin America, and Europe had succeeded in some of their goals, including the creation of state-run institutions that explicitly promoted women's rights, or feminist involvement in government; these institutions, however, also weakened feminist movements by letting the state take over implementation of feminist goals.

European and Latin American third-wave feminism began in the 1990s, as lipstick feminism and consumerist feminism started to come to an end and as feminist activists were rejecting queer theory espoused by American academics. [further citation needed] Fourth-wave feminism developed slowly, globally via the media and the Internet. The wave emerged from a new generation of women who had largely not been informed about previous waves through their education at high school, institutions and university. Knowledge about feminism was gained informally, and it developed a virtual academy where feminists learned that "the personal is political"; it did not emerge from structured feminist learning. Fourth-wave feminism, like other waves before it, in this period was not about the existence of a single ideology, entity, or collective. It was about drawing together in collective groups to work together towards a common goal of ending violence against women in order to free them for the options to take the paths they desire; it was about mutual commitment and support to other women.

The movement in Spain traces its roots to the murder of Ana Orantes; on 17 December 1997 she was burned to death by her husband in her house in Granada for speaking publicly on  about abuse she suffered at his hands. Early fourth-wave Spanish feminism used television and newspapers as the primary social network. Orantes' death took the topic of gender violence out of the privacy of the home and brought it to national attention, and resulted in RTVE changing its policies on how the station reported on gender-based and sexist violence. Similar conversations took place at other television networks and media organizations across the country. Jokes about women being hit by boyfriends and husbands were no longer acceptable on Spanish TV. They later went on to talk about Spain's gender parity pay problems and the glass ceiling for them, and promoted taking activism to virtual spaces.

The beginnings of this movement in this period took place in Latin America, Argentina, and Poland. Some of this global desire to act, particularly in a Polish context, came out of the World Conference on Women, 1995 in Beijing.

Social media had an amplifying effect as the fourth-wave feminist movement began to grow. 2018 would be the year that fourth-wave feminism began its peak in Spain, Argentina, and Brazil as a result of a number of different factors, with women mobilized on a large scale to take to the streets. Their mobilization also challenged for the first time, the legitimacy of Spain's judiciary, whereas in previous waves the focus had been more on political leadership and acts of the legislature. The wave in Spain would also face a major challenge, including the emergence of Vox, a far right political party who won seats in Andalusia. Vox was opposed to The Organic Law of Comprehensive Protection Measures against Gender Violence and wanted to see it overturned.  In Argentina, the peak would be around the abortion rights issue which saw thousands of women with green scarves take to the streets.

In an anglosphere feminist context, journalist Pythia Peay argued for the existence of a fourth wave as early as 2005, to focus on social justice and civil rights, and in 2011, Jennifer Baumgardner dated the start of the fourth wave to 2008. Twitter, the social network most popular with the 18-to-29 age group, was created in 2006, making feminism more accessible, and giving rise to "hashtag feminism".

In 2013, Democratic Texas State Senator Wendy Davis staged a 13-hour filibuster in Texas, in an attempt to prevent an anti-abortion bill from passing. Other women showed support by rallying around the Texas State Capitol, and those who were not physically present used the hashtag #StandWithWendy. Similarly, women protested the perceived sexist questions (for example, focusing on appearance or love life) often directed at female celebrities by tweeting the hashtag #askhermore.

Other feminist movements and "calls to action" have arisen from the fourth wave. One is the "HeForShe" campaign which originated from Emma Watson's viral UN Women speech in 2014 and her subsequent activism. Several other incidents have galvanized the movement, including the Delhi gang rape (India, 2012), Jimmy Savile allegations (UK, 2012), Bill Cosby sexual assault cases (US, 2014), Isla Vista killings (US, 2014), trial of Jian Ghomeshi (Canada, 2016), Harvey Weinstein allegations (US, 2017) and subsequent Me Too movement and Weinstein effect, the Westminster sexual scandals (worldwide and UK, 2017), and the La Manada gang rape case in Spain (2018).

Due to the simultaneous existence of multiple waves of feminism – namely the second, third, and fourth – many scholars are questioning the use of the wave metaphor in feminism. However, it is still the terminology most commonly used and most easily understood by the public. As the fourth wave finds much of its definition in relation to the previous ones, it is important to understand what the other waves were:

Internationally, comparisons between waves can be difficult. Anglospheric first-wave feminism is second-wave for Europeans and Latin American feminists. Second-wave American and British feminism is also third-wave for Europeans and Latin Americans. Spanish feminism went through several waves in the Franco era.

Broadly speaking, there are first-wave feminism taking place from the mid-nineteenth century to 1965, second-wave feminism taking place from 1965 to 1975, and third-wave feminism taking place from 1975 to 2012.  Fourth-wave feminism in Spain began in the mid-1990s. When resolving waves around the work of important Spanish-speaking feminists discussing wave theory like Amelia Valcárcel, the Spanish fourth-wave may at times actually represent an international fifth wave, not a fourth one.

Each feminist wave has a separate identity, although they get harder to distinguish and define clearly as time goes on, due to debate among activists and scholars. In an Anglospheric feminist context, the first wave was characterized by the suffragette movements and had the aim of legalizing women voting in public elections. In the same context, second wave is more difficult to comprehensively define, but is thought to have roots in the 1960s. Its focus shifted to social and personal rights, such as equal pay, choice over bodily issues, sexual liberation, and resistance to the gendered double standard in society. There is much debate among Anglosphere academics and activists regarding the true definition of the third wave of feminism. It is most commonly understood as a push by younger generations to create a feminism more centered on inclusivity; privileging the plights of queer and non-white women in their messaging. American poet Natasha Sajé has written, "[It] is an amalgamation of many different streams of theorizing—including that of women of color and younger women disillusioned with what they perceive to make up the body of 'second wave' feminism—in intrinsically different formulations than the theorizing coming from anti-feminists".

Ideas
British journalist Kira Cochrane and British feminist scholar Prudence Bussey-Chamberlain describe the fourth wave as focusing on justice for women, particularly opposition to sexual harassment (including street harassment), violence against women, workplace discrimination and harassment, body shaming, sexist imagery in the media, online misogyny, campus sexual assault and assault on public transport, and rape culture. They also say it supports intersectionality, social media activism, and online petitioning. Its essence, Chamberlain writes, is "incredulity that certain attitudes can still exist". Events and organizations involved in fourth-wave feminism include Everyday Sexism Project, UK Feminista, Reclaim the Night, One Billion Rising, and "a Lose the Lads' mags protest". 

Books associated with the fourth wave include: 
 Men Explain Things to Me (2014) by American writer Rebecca Solnit (notably, a 2008 essay also called Men Explain Things to Me, reprinted in the book, gave rise to the term mansplaining)
 The Vagenda (2014) by British writers Rhiannon Lucy Cosslett and Holly Baxter (based on their online UJ feminist magazine, The Vagenda, launched in 2012)
 Sex Object: A Memoir (2016) by American writer Jessica Valenti
 Everyday Sexism (2016) by British writer Laura Bates (based on Bates' Everyday Sexism Project)

Cosslett and Baxter's book aims to debunk stereotypes of femininity promoted by mainstream women's press. Bates, a British feminist writer, created the Everyday Sexism Project on 16 April 2012 as an online forum where women could post their experiences of everyday harassment.

Third-wave feminists began introducing the concept of male privilege in their writings in the 1990s, and fourth-wave feminists continue to discuss it in academia and on social media. American Peggy McIntosh was one of the first feminists to describe the phenomenon of privilege in 1988, calling it (in regards to white privilege) "an invisible weightless knapsack of special provisions, maps, passports, codebooks, visas, clothes, tools, and blank checks." Fourth-wave feminists have taken action to reduce and combat this "knapsack" by raising awareness of privileged and unprivileged groups. Alliance is greatly encouraged by these feminists, who believe that males and other privileged groups can still take action for social change within their communities.

London author Nikki van der Gaag discusses the damaging effects of raising young boys with privilege, citing the Consultative Group on Early Child Care and Development, "a tendency to privilege boys [...] does not teach teach boys responsibility, nor clarify what will be expected from them". Fourth-wave feminists have begun promoting solutions to avoid these issues, such as raising children as gender-neutral. Professor of Neuroscience at Chicago Medical School Lise Eliot points out that infants and growing children are so impressionable that any small differences in raising the child can lead to large personality differences over time, resulting in reinforced gender stereotypes.

Fourth-wave feminists have argued that reinforced gender stereotypes create pressure for men to be breadwinners, as opposed to women, who feel obligated to take on the role of homemakers. Feminists argue that these pressures to conform socially can cause gender discrimination in the workplace and more widely in society. According to Pew Research, a majority of women working in male-dominated workplaces believe that sexual harassment is a problem in their industry.

Intersectionality 
British professor of marketing and consumer research Pauline Maclaran argues that although celebrities are at the forefront of fourth-wave feminism, ready access to information has enabled the movement to draw greater attention to economic inequalities faced by women than heretofore possible.

Regarded as more inclusive of the LGBTQIA+ community, fourth-wave feminists such as Jacob Bucher of Baker University have protested stereotypes surrounding men's supposed uncontrolled sexual desire and objectification of women. He states that gay men specifically are stigmatized by such stereotypes because they lie outside of the typical standard for masculinity.

Canadian art historian Ruth Phillips argues that fourth-wave feminism falls within the broader agenda of financial, political, and environmental concerns and is recognized as a key factor in alleviating poverty, improving women's health, and achieving economic growth.

In Latin American fourth-wave feminism, a similar concept to intersectionality is that of transversality. It describes "a form of feminism that addresses a wide range of issues in an effort to represent the heterogeneity of society". Examples include addressing colonialism or racism, economic topics, and LGBTQ issues.

Around the world 

As fourth-wave feminism became popular in the United States, other countries were also dealing with similar issues. Although the reactions of local governments differed, the movement of fourth-wave feminists continued. Some of the hashtags associated with the movement included:

 #AndNow or NowWhat in Canada
  in China
  in France
 #NotinMyName in India
  in Italy
 #BoycottAliZafar, #BoycottTeefainTrouble, #TeefaisTrouble in Pakistan
  in the Philippines
  in Spain
 #AmINext in South Africa

As the importance of social media in "creating and sustaining feminist community" is an increasingly popular idea, "diversity and creativity continue to characterize feminist activism" around the world in the 21st century. Communities around the globe witnessed the reflections of "the current, Internet-based fourth wave" feminism and investigated the difference of it. Moreover, the increasing social power of fourth-wave feminist movements prioritize these issues for elected governments, encouraging them to engage with the "new and young feminisms" of the modern day.

For instance, in Canada, after the #MeToo hashtag started trending in October 2017, hundreds of people began to credit fourth-wave feminists with the movement. Another hashtag, #AndNow, became popular in Canada due to the support of Prime Minister Justin Trudeau. #AndNow supported discussing the solution to sexual harassment or abuse in the workplace to help people fight for equity between all people.

In India, there have been several movements or protests with large numbers of women, which have changed the perspective of many in the nation regarding femininity. These include the 2003 Blank Noise Project, the 2009 Pink Chaddi (underwear) movement, the 2011 SlutWalk protest, the 2015 Pinjra Tod (Break the Cage) movement and the 2017 Bekhauf Azadi (Freedom without Fear) March. Indian social discourse started to focus on long-term and deep-rooted issues, such as gender inequality, sexual violence, child marriage, sex-selective abortions, and dowry-related violence. Many believe it led to the questioning of women's freedoms, choices, and desires in society. The influence and power of the campaign made the government expand the legal definition of rape, introduced "harsher punishment for rapists, criminalizing stalking and voyeurism", showed "a new kind of Indian femininity that was comfortable with her modernity and sexuality" and demonstrates the rise of fourth-wave feminism in India.

Ni una menos (meaning "Not One Less") is a Latin American feminist movement originating in Argentina which aims to end violence against women. The movement has engaged in women's strikes, including the International Women's Strike. Ni una menos has been described as fourth wave feminism. According to Cecilia Palmeiro, a founding member of the Ni Una Menos collective, "By connecting perspectives such as indigenous feminism with black feminism, migrant feminism, queer feminism, and popular feminism, we made alliances and enlightened the intersection of violences as well as featured possible strategies of resistance. That is why our movement has been described as a fourth wave of feminism or feminism of the 99 percent."

The main goal was to protest against Bolsonaro's presidential campaign and his sexist declarations. It was being used even among national and international celebrities. Madonna was one of the international celebrities who took part in the movement. She posted in her Instagram, where she has more than 12.1 million followers, a picture in which she appears with her mouth sealed by a tape with the saying "freedom". Above, it reads in Portuguese  (He won't devalue us, he won't silence us, he won't oppress us).

Because Latin American fourth-wave feminism encompasses simultaneously distinct movements, many of which are in tension with one another, some refer to Latin American 'feminisms' in the plural. One of the more controversial branches emerged as a reaction to and rejection of queer feminism and of postmodern feminism, and consists of trans-exclusionary activists who reject prominent feminist academics like Judith Butler and much of feminist theory and seek to create a new anti-LGBT feminist movement by redefining 'woman' as exclusively cisgender and non-intersex, seeking to reframe the queer feminist movement not as an inclusive but as a watering-down of feminism and erasure of females. Whereas queer feminism was inclusive by expanding binary and cisnormative concepts of gender, these Latin American feminists argue that Butler was attempting to erase the concept of womanhood and thereby women as political subjects, and reject gender studies, calling it a conspiracy to hide women in academia. Defining identity through biology instead of gender, and replacing postmodern concepts of femininity with gender-essentialism, they frame queer feminism as a conspiracy to hide 'male' aggressors (trans women) and oppress females.

Social media
While previous waves of feminism have encountered such obstacles as rigid sociopolitical structures and a lack of available communication channels, fourth-wave feminists harness digital media as a far-reaching platform on which to connect, share perspectives, create a broader view of experienced oppression, and critique past feminist waves. Social media allows women to share their experiences from all over the world and is a space where people can rally for change.

Kira Cochrane has argued that fourth-wave feminism is "defined by technology" and characterized particularly by the use of Facebook, Twitter, Instagram, YouTube, Tumblr, and blogs such as Feministing to challenge misogyny.

Social media activism has manifested as Twitter threads critiquing perceived transphobia in the media and in so-called "hashtag feminism" campaigns, notably #MeToo, #YesAllWomen, #bringbackourgirls, #NotYourAsianSidekick and #SolidarityIsForWhiteWomen. Girlgaze, launched by Amanda de Cadenet, is an online multi-sided platform that directly connects businesses, companies and brands with women and non-binary creative talent, promoting the need for diversity, inclusion and representation across the creative industry. Time named a group of activists prominent in the #MeToo movement, dubbed "the silence breakers", as its 2017 Person of the Year.

Other fourth-wave feminist campaigns include the Feminist Coalition, Everyday Sexism Project, No More Page 3, Stop Bild Sexism, Free the Nipple, SlutWalk, the 2017 and 2018 Women's Marches, Time's Up, and One Billion Rising. Artistic endeavors include Mattress Performance and 10 Hours of Walking in NYC as a Woman.

The most relevant form of intersectional feminism is through technology and social media. Researchers argue that social media gives intersectional feminism a bigger presence. With the addition of intersectionality, and the component of social media, discussions have ignited about "who is" or "who counts" as a feminist. Are individuals part of the movement just because they repost something on their Instagram story? This allows yet a new ideology of what feminism is to emerge. Intersectional feminism on social media allows discriminated and marginalized individuals a platform to voice sentiments to a large audience. Social media provides feminists with an outlet to share their struggles and organize events.

Sahar Khamis, a professor at University of Maryland, argues that social media gives feminists a unique avenue to highlight moments of solidarity in the social movement creating a powerful energy. Social media allows interconnected groups and individuals to network and connect with each other. Younger generations of feminists are more likely to form their beliefs and opinions and develop their support for the movement through social media.

Timeline

Criticism
One criticism of fourth-wave feminism is that it depends on technology. Ragna Rök Jóns argued that "[t]he key problem that this '4th Wave' will face will be the disproportionate access to and ownership of digital media devices." The fourth wave is left with the "inherent classism and ableism" created by giving the greatest voice to those who can afford and use technology, while the growth of social media in regions plagued by pervasive social injustice remains slow. North American sociologist Amanda E. Vickery claims that fourth-wave feminism marginalizes women of color who are fighting for inclusivity, neglecting the specific injustices they face to make way for the mainstream struggle.

Critics argue that efforts by large corporations such as Dove to capitalize on the movement through activist advertising may be inimical to fourth-wave feminism, which tends to be critical of capitalism as an economic system.

The conservative critique of fourth-wave feminism is that when women believe that the world is set against them through social systems such as patriarchy, they will abandon all efforts instead of competing with men as equals. Author Joanna Williams writes in The American Conservative that fourth-wave feminism encourages women to "call upon external helpmates, like the state, and ugly identity politics that push good men away". Williams also associates the movement with the "regressive left", claiming fourth-wave feminists are authoritarian and illiberal by dictating acceptable ideologies and policing the speech of men and women.

It is also argued that when people participate in Internet activism, they may not feel the need to do anything else to help the effort and to make themselves feel good. This type of activism is addressed in feminist punk band Le Tigre's 2001 song "Get Off the Internet", from before social media came into the picture. Later, in 2015, Alex Guardado asserted in an article on Twitter activism for NewUniversity.org that after contributing their say, people just "continue on with their day, liking other posts or retweeting". Some may think of themselves as activists while never bothering to attend a rally or extend their message beyond their Twitter fan base. While various feminist campaigns have spread via social media, the term slacktivism was coined to describe the mass media users who may speak out on their online platform but do little else to stimulate social action outside of their online platform. This forms part of a greater dialogue surrounding the roles and requirements of activism in an age where communities operate almost as equally online as they do face-to-face. 

Jennifer Simpkins of The Huffington Post argued in 2014 that fourth-wave feminism had created a hostile, Mean Girls–like atmosphere, in which women are more likely to tear each other down. "I've actually never once been belittled and attacked by a man for believing in the cause of feminism ... but women are just about lining up to take a whack at the shoddy piñata of my personal tastes and opinions". British scholar Ealasaid Munro says that the call-out culture of fourth-wave feminism risks marginalizing and separating people who could serve better as allies over minor disagreements.

Women and their gendered issues are not uniform and many variations in issues are a result of related issues such as race, sexuality, and class, and Munro also provides the critique that mainstream feminism is focused on the struggle of middle-class white women. Social campaigns that cast celebrities as the face of the movement, such as the Me Too movement, have been criticized, because celebrities often represent the privileged sectors of society, which in turn negate the efforts to expand upon the intersectionality of feminism.

The wave narrative itself is criticized due to perceptions that it is only inclusive of western feminist movements and that the fourth wave itself takes place in the global north, often neglecting the struggle of women in other regions. Critics also argue that using waves to define periods of feminism is no longer useful. They believe there is no need for it anymore and that it can get confusing.

Other critiques of fourth-wave feminism include its lack of clear evidence in most cases of social media use. Along with this, some argue that though all issues should be dealt with, smaller issues must not be inflated to a higher level by the feminist movement. One example of this is Matt Damon's response to the Harvey Weinstein case, "I do believe that there is a spectrum of behaviour, right? [...] There's a difference between, you know, patting someone on the butt and rape or child molestation, right?" Social media also can be seen as ineffective as it brings down "bogeyman" individuals rather than, "invent[ing] a different language or logic that can excise or alter the structures of oppression" as Sarah K. Burgess describes.

See also

 Anarcha-feminism
 Black feminism
 Equity feminism
 Feminism and media
 Fourth-wave feminism in Spain
 Material feminism
 Political lesbianism
 Postcolonial feminism
 Postfeminism
 Radical feminism
 Riot grrrl
 Social justice warrior
 Third-wave feminism
 Transfeminism
 Who Needs Feminism 
 YesAllWomen

Citations

General and cited references

Further reading

 
 
 

 
2010s in politics
Feminist movements and ideologies